Barakatulla "Barry" Sharifi (born November 10, 1997) is an American soccer player who plays as a midfielder.

Career

Youth, College & Amateur
Sharifi spent time with the New York Red Bulls academy, before playing four years of college soccer at Loyola University Maryland between 2016 and 2019, where he made 71 appearances, scored 19 goals and tallied 19 assists.

While in college, Sharifi appeared for USL Premier Development League sides Westchester Flames and New York Red Bulls U-23.

Professional
On January 13, 2020, Sharifi was selected 67th overall in the 2020 MLS SuperDraft by New York Red Bulls. On March 5, 2020, Sharifi signed his first professional contract with New York Red Bulls II in the USL Championship. He was released by Red Bulls II on November 30, 2020. On 19 February 2021, Sharifi joined Loudoun United FC ahead of the 2021 season.

On April 1, 2022, Sharifi signed with USL League One side South Georgia Tormenta.

References

External links 
 Loyola Greyhounds Profile
 

1997 births
Living people
American people of Afghan descent
American soccer players
Association football midfielders
Loudoun United FC players
Loyola Greyhounds men's soccer players
New York Red Bulls draft picks
New York Red Bulls U-23 players
New York Red Bulls II players
People from Jericho, New York
Soccer players from New York (state)
Sportspeople from Nassau County, New York
Sportspeople of Afghan descent
Tormenta FC players
USL Championship players
USL League Two players
Westchester Flames players